Mexico's coastal lowlands may refer to:
 The Gulf Coastal Plain
 The Pacific Coastal Plain